Stacy Doris (May 21, 1962 – January 31, 2012) was a poet who wrote in English and French. Doris used the name "Madame Wiener" or «Sa Femme» in some of her French work.

Life and work 
Stacy Doris was an innovative writer who imparted her “ferocity of living and invention” as she created new worlds of relationships with each book. As a teacher, each semester she would offer deep, exploratory seminars in different topics. For Doris, writing, learning, living and romancing were all in the service of one another.

Doris was influential in bridging the worlds of French and American poetry through her own fictions, as well as in the anthologies she edited. Some examples include The Violence of the White Page (Tyuonyi, 1991), with Emmanuel Hocquard, Twenty-two New (to North America) French Poets (Raddle Moon, 1997), with Norma Cole, and from French to English, Quelques-uns de mes contemporains: New American Writers (Java 2001).

Doris was an associate professor of creative writing at San Francisco State University, where a poetry award has been created in her honour. Her last published works were Fledge: A Phenomenology of Spirit (Nightboat Books, 2013), which she completed shortly before her death, and The Cake Part (Publication Studio, 2011) of which some 50 poets, film-makers and other artists contributed to making short films for the launch (see  Cake Part Virtual Launch).

Bibliography

Books
Fledge: a Phenomenology of Spirit (Night-boat Books, Callicoon, NY, 2012)
The Cake Part (Portland, OR: Publication Studio) 2011.
Paramour trans. Anne Porutgal and Caroline Dubois (Paris: P.O.L) 2009.
Knot (Athens, GA: University of Georgia Press) 2006. Winner of the University of *Georgia Contemporary Poetry Series Award.Parlement (Paris: P.O.L) 2005.Cheerleader’s Guide to the World : Council Book (NY: Roof) 2006.Conference (Bedford MA: Potes & Poets) 2001.
Une Année à New York avec Chester (Paris: P.O.L) 2000.
Paramour  (San Francisco: Krupskaya) 2000.
La Vie de Chester Steven Wiener écrite par sa femme (Paris: P.O.L) 1998.
Comment Aimer, trans. Anne Portugal and Caroline Dubois of Paramour excerpts (Grâne, France: Créaphis) 1998. 
Kildare (NY: Roof) 1995. Reprint at Kildare EPC

Audio compositions 
Parlement (l'Atelier de Création Radiophonique, France Culture Radio, director Jean Couturier) Original broadcast November 13, 2005. Rebroadcast at ACR, FranceCulture

Chapbooks
Le temps est à chacun, trans. Martin Richet from Knot (Marseille: Contrat Main) 2002.
Kildare, trans. Juliette Valery (Bordeaux: Format Américain) 1995.
Implements for Use (St. Denis: A. Slacik) 1995.
Mop Factory Incident (NY: Women's Studio) 1995. Reprint at: Mop Factory Incident WSW

Anthologies and collections
Editor, "Quelques-uns de mes contemporains: New American Writers," (Paris: Java) 2001.
Co-editor (with Chet Wiener), Christophe Tarkos: Ma Langue est Poétique--Selected Work (New York: Roof) 2001.
Editor, "Recent French Poetics" in Poetry on the Edge; a Symposium (Durham, NC: Duke University) 1999.
Co-editor (with Norma Cole), Twenty-two New (to North America) French Poets (Vancouver: Raddle Moon) 1997.
Co-editor (with Emmanuel Hocquard), Violence of the White Page, Contemporary French Poetry in Translation  (Santa Fe, NM: Pederal) 1992. Reprint at ViolenceWhitePage Duration

Notes and references

1962 births
2012 deaths
San Francisco State University faculty
American women poets
20th-century American poets
20th-century American women writers
21st-century American women